Andrew Kneisly (born 23 August 1983) is an American rugby league footballer who plays for the Philadelphia Fight. He represented the United States in the 2017 Rugby League World Cup.

Playing career
He has previously played for the Aston Bulls in the American National Rugby League and the Philadelphia Whitemarsh in rugby union.

He was selected to represent the USA in the 2017 Rugby League World Cup.

References

External links
Philadelphia Fight profile
2017 RLWC profile

1983 births
Living people
American rugby league players
American rugby union players
Aston Bulls players
Philadelphia Fight players
Rugby league props
Kneisly